Karl Gustav von Sandrart (1817-1898) was a Prussian general in the Franco-Prussian War of 1870.

Awards 

 Order of San Fernando in 1859
 Pour le Merite on 16 February 1871

References

1817 births
1898 deaths
German military personnel of the Franco-Prussian War
Generals of Infantry (Prussia)
Recipients of the Pour le Mérite (military class)
Prussian people of the Austro-Prussian War
People of the First Schleswig War
Military personnel from Szczecin